Dariunq was a region of the old Armenia c. 300-800 ruled by the Bagratuni family.

See also
List of regions of old Armenia

Early medieval Armenian regions

ca:Dariunq